"A Little Bit of Jazz" is a 1980 single by the group Nick Straker Band. With this song the British band had their only American success when it hit number one on the Dance Chart for one week.  The single failed to chart on both the American and British top 40 charts, but it peaked at number thirty-five on the Soul Singles Chart.

Track listings

1981 release 
12" vinyl
 US: Prelude / PRL D 612

Chart performance

References

1980 singles
1980 songs
Prelude Records (record label) singles
CBS Records singles
Songs written by Nick Straker
British jazz songs